The Israeli population is linguistically and culturally diverse. Hebrew is the country's official language, and almost the entire population speaks it either as native speakers or proficiently as a second language. Its standard form, known as Modern Hebrew, is the main medium of life in Israel. Arabic is used mainly by Israel's Arab minority which comprises about one-fifth of the population. Arabic has a special status under Israeli law.

Russian is spoken by about 20% of the Israeli population, mainly by the large immigrant population from the former Soviet Union, and English is a known foreign language by a significant proportion of the Israeli population as English is used widely in official logos and road signs alongside Hebrew and Arabic. In addition, the 19th edition of Ethnologue lists 36 languages and dialects spoken through Israel.

According to a 2011 Government Social Survey of Israelis over 20 years of age, 49% report Hebrew as their native language, Arabic 18%, Russian 15%, Yiddish 2%, French 2%, English 2%, 1.6% Spanish, and 10% other languages (including Romanian, German and Amharic, which were not offered as answers by the survey). This study also noted that 90% of Israeli Jews and over 60% of Israeli Arabs have a good understanding of Hebrew.

History

Several laws determine the official status of languages and language policy in Israel. This confusing situation has led to several appeals to the Supreme Court, whose rulings have enforced the current policies of national and local authorities.

On 19 July 2018, the Knesset passed a basic law under the title Israel as the Nation-State of the Jewish People, which defines Hebrew as "the State's language" and Arabic as a language with "a special status in the State" (article 4). The law further says that it should not be interpreted as compromising the status of the Arabic language in practice prior to the enactment of the basic law, namely, it preserves the status quo and changes the status of Hebrew and Arabic only nominally.

Before the enactment of the aforementioned basic law, the status of official language in Israel was determined by the 82nd paragraph of the Constitution of Mandatory Palestine, which was promulgated by an Order in Council of the British Crown on 14 August 1922, as amended in 1939:

"All Ordinances, official notices and official forms of the Government and all official notices of local authorities and municipalities in areas to be prescribed by order of the High Commissioner, shall be published in English, Arabic and Hebrew."
This law, like most other laws of the British Mandate, was adopted in the State of Israel, subject to certain amendments published by the Provisional State Council on 19 May 1948. The amendment states that:
"Any provision in the law requiring the use of the English language is repealed."

Apart from Hebrew, Arabic and English, the use of Russian dramatically increased with massive arrivals of Jewish immigrants from the Soviet Union. Today, Russian TV channels and media are widely available alongside Hebrew and Arabic media.

Initially French was used as a diplomatic language in Israel, and was also used alongside Hebrew on official documents such as passports until the 1990s, even though most state officials and civil servants were more fluent in English. However, the Israeli-French alliance unraveled in the runup to the 1967 Six-Day War, leading to decreased use of French. Israeli passports switched from French to English during the 1990s.

Official language

Hebrew
The British Mandate articles, issued by the Council of the League of Nations in 1922, and the 1922 Palestine Order in Council were the first in modern times to acknowledge Hebrew as an official language of a political entity. This was a significant achievement for the Zionist movement, which sought to establish Hebrew as the national language of the Jewish people and discouraged the use of other Jewish languages, particularly Yiddish, just like Aramaic replaced Hebrew in ancient times.

The movement for the revival of Hebrew as a spoken language was particularly popular among new Jewish Zionist immigrants who came to Ottoman ruled Mutasarrifate of Jerusalem beginning in the 1880s. Eliezer Ben-Yehuda (born in the Russian Empire) and his followers created the first Hebrew-speaking schools, newspapers, and other Hebrew-language institutions. Max Weinreich notes in his book, History of the Yiddish Language, Volume 1, the "very making of Hebrew into a spoken language derives from the will to separate from the Diaspora". After Ben Yehuda's immigration to Israel, and due to the impetus of the Second Aliyah (1905–1914), Hebrew prevailed as the single official and spoken language of the Jewish community of Mandatory Palestine. When the State of Israel was formed in 1948, the government viewed Hebrew as the de facto official language and initiated a melting pot policy, where every immigrant was required to study Hebrew and often to adopt a Hebrew surname. Use of Yiddish, which was the main competitor prior to World War II, was discouraged, and the number of Yiddish speakers declined as the older generations died out. However, Yiddish is still often used in Ashkenazi Haredi communities worldwide, and is sometimes the first language for the members of the Hasidic branches of such communities.

Today, Hebrew is the official language used in government, commerce, court sessions, schools, and universities. It is the language most commonly used in everyday life in Israel. Native Hebrew speakers comprise about 53% of the population. The vast majority of the rest speak Hebrew fluently as a second language. Native-born Israeli Jews are typically native speakers of Hebrew, but a significant minority of Israelis are immigrants who learned Hebrew as a second language. Immigrants who come under the Law of Return are entitled to a free course in an ulpan, or Hebrew language school. Most of them speak fluent Hebrew, but some do not. Most Israeli-Arabs, who comprise a large national minority, and members of other minorities are also fluent in Hebrew. Historically, Hebrew was taught in Arab schools from the third grade onward, but it has been gradually introduced from kindergarten onward starting in September 2015. A Hebrew exam is an essential part of the matriculation exams for students of Israeli schools. The state-affiliated Academy of the Hebrew Language, established in 1953 by a Knesset law, is tasked with researching the Hebrew language and offering standardized rules for the use of the language by the state.

A survey by the Central Bureau of Statistics released in 2013 found that 90% of Israeli Jews were proficient in Hebrew and 70% were highly proficient. It also found that 60% of Israeli Arabs were proficient or highly proficient in Hebrew, while 17% could not read it and 12% could not speak it.

Other languages

Arabic

Literary Arabic, along with Hebrew, has special status under Israeli law. Various spoken dialects are used, and Arabic is the native language among Israeli-Arabs. In 1949, there were 156,000 Arabs in Israel, most of whom did not speak Hebrew. Today, the figure stands at about 1.6 million, and although most are proficient in Hebrew, Arabic remains their primary native language.

In addition, a significant number of Israeli Jews know spoken Arabic, although only a very small number are fully literate in written Arabic. Arabic is the native language of older generations of those Mizrahi Jews who immigrated from Arabic-speaking countries. Arabic lessons are widespread in Hebrew-speaking schools from the seventh through ninth grades. Those who wish to do so may opt to continue their Arabic studies through the twelfth grade and take an Arabic matriculation exam. A 2015 study found that 17% of Israeli Jews can understand Arabic and 10% can speak it fluently, but only 2.5% can read an article in the language, 1.5% can write a letter in it, and 1% can read a book in it.

For many years, the Israeli authorities were reluctant to use Arabic, except when explicitly ordered by law (for example, in warnings on dangerous chemicals), or when addressing the Arabic-speaking population. This has changed following a November 2000 supreme court ruling which ruled that although second to Hebrew, the use of Arabic should be much more extensive. Since then, all road signs, food labels, and messages published or posted by the government must also be translated into Literary Arabic, unless being issued by the local authority of an exclusively Hebrew-speaking community. As of December 2017, 40% of digital panels on public buses list their routes in both Hebrew and Arabic across the country, and, starting in 2015, Arabic has been increasingly featured in signs along highways and in railway stations.

Arabic was always considered a legitimate language for use in the Knesset alongside Hebrew, but only rarely have Arabic-speaking Knesset members made use of this privilege as while all Arabic-speaking MKs are fluent in Hebrew, fewer Hebrew-speaking MKs can understand Arabic.

In March 2007, the Knesset approved a new law calling for the establishment of an Arabic Language Academy similar to the Academy of the Hebrew Language. This institute was established in 2008, its centre is in Haifa and it is currently headed by Prof. Mahmud Ghanayem.

In 2008, a group of Knesset members proposed a bill to remove Arabic's status as an official language, making it an "official secondary language". That bill did not pass.

In 2009, Israel Katz, the transport minister, suggested that signs on all major roads in Israel, East Jerusalem and possibly parts of the West Bank would be amended, replacing English and Arabic place names with straight transliterations of the Hebrew name. Currently most road signs are in all three languages. Nazareth, for example, would become "Natzeret". The Transport Ministry said signs would be replaced gradually as necessary due to wear and tear. This has been criticized as an attempt to erase the Arabic language and Palestinian heritage in Israel. Israel's governmental names' committee unanimously rejected that suggestion in 2011.

Russian

Russian is by far the most widely spoken non-official language in Israel. Over 20% of Israelis are fluent in Russian after mass Jewish immigration from the USSR (Russian Jews in Israel) and its successor states in the 1970s, 1990s, and 2000s. The government and businesses often provide both written and verbal information in Russian. There is also an Israeli television broadcast channel in Russian. In addition, some Israeli schools also offer Russian language courses. The children of Russian immigrants to Israel generally pick up Hebrew as their dominant language, but most still speak Russian, and a majority still use Russian instead of Hebrew with family and Russian-speaking friends. As of 2017 there are up to 1.5 million Russian-speaking Israelis.

Most Jewish immigrants from the Soviet Union were highly educated with almost 45 percent of them having some kind of higher education. Despite the fact that the native language of a significant part of the country's population is Russian, the language occupies a modest role in Israel's education system. Hebrew University started teaching Russian in 1962. In public schools, the first Russian-language classes were opened in the 1970s in large cities. The number of students enrolled in these programs dropped in the 1980s as immigration from the Soviet Union slowed down. In the 1990s, a Russian-language program carried out by local governments called Na'leh 16 included some 1,500 students. In 1997, about 120 schools in Israel taught Russian in one way or another.

Traditionally, Russian speakers read newspapers and listen to radio more often than Hebrew speakers. Nasha strana was the major Russian-newspaper in Israel during the 1970s, when it competed with Tribuna for the immigrant reader. In 1989, there was only one daily in Russian, and 6 in 1996. Since the 2000s, the number of Russian-language newspapers started to decline due to the increasing number of television and online media. Israeli television provides daily translation in Hebrew, Arabic, and Russian. In 2002, the Israeli Russian-speaking commercial Channel 9 was launched. It is also known as Israel Plus. In November 2007, a typical digital package included 45 channels in foreign languages, with 5 in Russian. At 2004 there were four dailies, 11 weeklies, five monthlies and over 50 local newspapers published in Russian in Israel, with a total circulation of about 250,000 during weekends. Daily radio services in Russian are also available throughout Israel.

Yiddish 
Yiddish has been traditionally the language of Ashkenazi Jews in Eastern Europe and the second most widely spoken Jewish language after Hebrew. Currently, it is spoken by approximately 200,000 Israelis, mostly in Hasidic communities. Yiddish is a Germanic language, but incorporates elements of Hebrew. Yiddish saw a decline in its prevalence among the Israeli population in the early statehood of Israel, due to its banning in theatres, movies and other cultural activities. It has undergone a cultural revival in recent years. Yiddish is the primary language in some Haredi Ashkenazi communities in Israel. However, despite state-sponsored initiatives for preserving Yiddish culture, the number of Yiddish-speaking Israelis is in decline as older generations of Ashkenazi Jews die. In addition, due to greater integration of Haredim, many families in Yiddish-speaking Haredi communities have switched to using primarily Hebrew at home, which has led to these communities to launch preservation campaigns. In a 2013 survey, about 2% of Israelis over the age of 20 recorded Yiddish as their native language.

English
In 2018, the director of the Israeli Ministry of Education stated that graduates who lacked English proficiency were effectively "handicapped" in today's economy. An October 2017 report by the Israel Central Bureau of Statistics showed that 38% of Israelis ages 16 to 65 said they lacked basic English skills like speaking, reading, or writing and 13% reported that they do not know any English whatsoever. English retains a role comparable to that of an official language.

In 1999, the High Court of Justice ruled that English, Arabic and Hebrew were inherited as official languages by Israel, but that English had been removed by the Law and Administration Ordinance of 1948. The Ordinance said:
"Any provision in the law requiring the use of the English language is repealed."
In practice, the use of English decreased dramatically during the state's early years. At first, French was used as a diplomatic language, even though most state officials and civil servants were more fluent in English. During the late 1960s, the Israeli-French alliance was undermined, leading to a stronger Israeli-United States alliance and paving the way for the English language to regain much of its lost status. Today, English is the primary language for international relations and foreign exchange, but it is not sanctioned for use in Knesset debates or in drafting legislation. Some British Mandate laws are still formulated in English, and the process of their translation into Hebrew has been gradual. English is required as a second language in schools and universities, for both Hebrew and Arabic-speaking students. Despite the country's history of British mandatory rule, written English in Israel today uses primarily American spelling, punctuation, and grammar.

Although English does not enjoy the same status as Hebrew and Arabic do, English proficiency is a core requirement in the public education system and road signs are generally written in English after Hebrew and Arabic. English is taught in public schools from the third grade to high school, and passing an English oral and written test is a prerequisite for receiving a Bagrut (matriculation certificate). Most universities also regard a high level of English as a prerequisite for admission. Exposure to American culture has been massive in Israel in recent decades, and foreign language television shows are generally presented in the original language with Hebrew subtitles rather than dubbed, which means that there is a high level of exposure to English in the media. 
 
Most Israelis can converse in and read English on at least a basic level, and secular Israelis who are of a high social and economic status usually possess greater capabilities in English than those who are of a lower social and economic status (this is mostly due to differing levels of state-sponsored education, as well as variation in cultural exposure to the language). Israelis born from the 1980s onward generally have better English language skills than their parents and grandparents due to growing up with a higher level of exposure to the language in the media. "Proper" usage of the English language is considered a mark of good education among Israelis. In the past, several politicians, including David Levy and Amir Peretz, were mocked openly in the media and in public for their poor English skills.

Due to immigration from English-speaking countries, a small but significant minority of Israeli Jews are native English speakers. One survey found that about 2% of Israelis spoke English as their native language.

Policy towards immigrants' languages

The melting pot policy, which governed the Israel language policy in its early days, was gradually neglected during the late 1970s. While in the 1950s Israeli law banned Yiddish-language theaters and forced civil servants to adopt Hebrew surnames, the new policy allowed immigrants to communicate with the authorities in their language of origin and encouraged them to keep their original language and culture. This new practice has become evident since the early 1990s with massive immigration from the former Soviet Union and the additional immigration from Ethiopia (Ethiopian Jews in Israel). Israeli authorities began to use Russian and Amharic extensively when communicating with these new immigrants. During the 1991 Gulf War, warnings and instructions were issued in at least seven languages. In 1991, a new radio station was erected, called "REKA", which is a Hebrew acronym for "Aliyah Absorption Network". At first, it broadcast exclusively in Russian, also containing programming aimed at teaching Hebrew, which included veteran Israel radio broadcasters recapping news in "easy Hebrew"; some years later, Amharic and Tigrinya time slots were introduced. Just as news in Arabic existed on Arutz 1, news programmes appeared in Russian, Amharic and Tigrinya. Several newspapers and magazines were published in Russian and easy Hebrew with Niqqud. In the beginning of the twenty-first century, the first Russian-language TV channel was created.

Other spoken languages
Many other languages are used by large sectors of the Israeli population, including:

 Romanian: It is estimated that 82,300 first generation and at least 126,200 second generation Romanian Jews lived in Israel by 2012. Additionally, it is estimated that 14,700 Romanians nationals worked in Israel as of 2010 (with or without a work permit). These figures do not include Moldovan-born Jews and Moldovan migrants, which in turn are listed as former Soviet. However, these numbers do not account for actual language speakers but only nationality, as there is no recent data on the number of Romanophones living in Israel.
 German is spoken natively by around 100,000 Israelis. During Ottoman rule and the mandate period, as well as during the first decades of Israeli statehood, German was one of the primary languages of Jews living there. In 1979, a Goethe Institute branch opened in Tel Aviv. By 2006, increasing numbers of Israelis were studying German, and at the time four Israeli schools offered German as an elective course.
 Amharic: Spoken by most of Israel's 130,000 Ethiopian Jews, most of whom arrived in two massive operations transporting tens of thousands of Ethiopian Jews from Ethiopia to Israel in 1984 and 1991, Amharic is often used in government announcements and publications. Amharic is also spoken by the Ethiopian Orthodox Tewahedo Church.
 Georgian/Judaeo-Georgian: Although most Georgian Jewish immigrants can also speak Russian, they converse among themselves in Georgian.
 Ladino: The Sephardi Jewish language and the third most widely spoken Jewish language, Ladino is a variant of medieval Spanish, intermixed with Hebrew and with vocabulary from various other languages where Jews emigrated after being expelled from Spain. It is spoken by many Sephardi Jews. Today there is a state-supported authority for preserving the Ladino culture – La Autoridad Nasionala del Ladino i su Kultura.
 Polish: Polish was spoken by the large number of immigrants from Poland. Today, it is somewhat common in Polish moshavei ovdim (workers' settlements) created during the 1940s and 1950s. There are also several thousand Polish Jews living in Israel who immigrated after the 1968 Polish political crisis; most were born and raised in Poland, speak the language fluently amongst themselves, and have made attempts to impart the language to their children.
 Ukrainian: While most Ukrainian Jews speak Russian, there is still a segment of Ukrainian speakers.
 Spanish: Spanish is spoken by Jews from Argentina and other olim from other Spanish-speaking countries, as well as by some Sephardi groups. Spanish is not restricted to Sephardim, as most Argentine Jews are actually Ashkenazim. Spanish has never been part of the curriculum in Israel, and Spanish is only taught as a foreign language in universities and Instituto Cervantes. However, the popularity of soap operas from Argentina and Venezuela, broadcast in Spanish with Hebrew subtitles by Viva in the 1990s, has extended a passive understanding of the language to some of the TV viewers.
 French: over 20% of Israeli adults have some knowledge of French. 250,000 to  350,000 Israeli are French speakers. A hybrid Jewish French, called "Franbreu", is emerging. French is spoken by many Moroccan, Algerian, and Tunisian Jews, either as a native or second language of these francized Maghrebi Jews, French is also spoken by the increasing number of new immigrants from France and other French-speaking countries, as well as by foreign workers from French speaking Africa. Also, French is still taught in many Israeli schools and universities and due to immigration from France a small but significant 2% of Israeli Jews are native French speakers. The French embassy's Institut Français supports French studies in Israeli schools. Israel has tried to join La Francophonie, but has been rebuffed by its Arab members. Tel Aviv University is a member of the Agence universitaire de la Francophonie (AUF). Concentrations of French speakers are found in the towns of Netanya and Ashdod.
 Italian/Judaeo-Italian: In addition to being spoken by Italian Jews, Italian is also spoken by many Jews from Libya (a former Italian colony) and immigrants from other former Italian colonies (Eritrea and Somalia) as a primary or second language. As a result of growing demand, Italian may be taken as an optional subject in some schools.
 Hungarian: Hungarian is spoken by approximately 70,000 Hungarian Jews in Israel.
 Turkish: Turkish is spoken by some of the 77,000 Turkish Jews and their families, who immigrated from Turkey in the second half of the 20th century and also by foreign workers. Many of the Turkish speakers in Israel also speak Ladino.
 Persian: Persian is spoken by some of the 135,000 Iranian Jews who immigrated from Iran and their children.
 Kayla and Qwara: These languages are spoken by Ethiopian Jews in addition to Amharic. Kayla appears to be extinct.
 Chinese, Filipino, and Thai: While spoken by a negligible number of Israeli Jews, Chinese, Tagalog, and Thai have made inroads in Israeli society in recent years due to an influx of non-Jewish immigrants from China, the Philippines, and Thailand. It is estimated that there are 180,000 such illegal immigrants. Many (though mostly Vietnamese) legally entered the country when Israel opened their doors to "boat people" from war-torn Southeast Asia in the 1970s.
 Marathi: Marathi is the language of Bene Israel – Indian Jews from the Konkan region of the state of Maharashtra in India. They migrated to Israel beginning in 1948, when the State of Israel was established. In 1977, they numbered about 20,000. Concentrations of Marathi speakers are found in the towns of Dimona and Beersheba.
 Malayalam: Judeo-Malayalam is the traditional language of the Cochin Jews (also called Malabar Jews), from the state of Kerala, in South India.
 Judeo-Moroccan Arabic: Judeo-Moroccan Arabic is the native language spoken by the majority of Moroccan Jews that immigrated to Israel from Morocco during the 1950s and 1960s. There is a Judeo-Moroccan Arabic radio program on Israeli radio.
 Bukhori: Bukhori is spoken by the Bukharian Jews who immigrated from Central Asia.
 Judeo-Tat: Judeo-Tat (also known as Juhuri) is spoken by the Mountain Jews who immigrated from Russia and Azerbaijan.
 Jewish Neo-Aramaic: Jewish Neo-Aramaic language is the native language spoken by Kurdish Jews that immigrated to Israel from Iraq, Turkey, and Iran during the 1940s and 1950s.
 Greek and Judeo-Greek: Greek is spoken by Greek-Orthodox church and by a number of Greek Jews and Romaniotes. 
 Adyghe language: spoken by the Adyghe people in two villages in the north of Israel.
 Armenian: spoken by Armenians in Israel.

Sign languages 
 Israeli Sign Language is the main language amongst deaf Israelis. It comes from Jewish educators of the Deaf from Germany who relocated to start the first school for the deaf in Israel.
 Russian Sign Language, used by the immigrant community
and several village sign languages,
 Ghardaia Sign Language, AKA Algerian Jewish Sign Language
 Al-Sayyid Bedouin Sign Language
 Kafr Qasem Sign Language 
 Arab El-Naim Sign Language (or Al-Naim)
 Ein Mahel Sign Language
 Abu Kaf Bedouin Sign Language
 Al-Atrash Sign Language

See also

 Demographics of Israel

Notes

References

External links
 Languages of Israel – Ethnologue entry for Israel.
 Language Policy Research Center, Bar Ilan University, Ramat Gan, Israel.

 
Multilingualism

bn:ইসরায়েল#ভাষা